Started in 2002, Draper Richards Kaplan Foundation (DRK Foundation) is a global venture philanthropy firm supporting social enterprises.

History

The Draper Richards Kaplan Foundation is the philanthropic arm of Draper Richards, a venture capital firm founded by William H. Draper, III and Robin Richards Donohoe in 1994. DRK Foundation was originally founded as the Draper Richards Foundation in 2002 and began by making investments in the United States and India. In 2010, Robert Steven Kaplan of the Harvard Business School joined the Foundation and it changed its name to the Draper Richards Kaplan Foundation.

Portfolio

Since beginning this work in 2002, DRK has invested in more than 190 organizations. Organizations funded include Peepul India in 2020, Watsi in 2013, Kiva in 2007, Living Goods in 2007, and Room to Read in 2002.

See also

 Laura and John Arnold Foundation
 Mulago Foundation
 Ssamba Foundation
 Jasmine Social Investments
 Good Ventures
 High impact philanthropy

References

External links
 

Foundations based in the United States
Menlo Park, California
Organizations established in 1994
1994 establishments in California